Division No. 14 is a census division in Alberta, Canada. The majority of the division is located in the western portion of central Alberta, while the westernmost portion of the division is located within Alberta's Rockies. The division's largest urban community is the Town of Hinton.

Census subdivisions 
The following census subdivisions (municipalities or municipal equivalents) are located within Alberta's Division No. 14.

Towns
Edson
Hinton
Municipal districts
Yellowhead County
Improvement districts
Improvement District No. 25 (Willmore Wilderness Park)

Demographics 

See also 
List of census divisions of Alberta
List of communities in Alberta

References 

Census divisions of Alberta